Thomas Matthew Burns  KC*HS (born 3 June 1944) is a British Roman Catholic bishop. On 16 October 2008 he was appointed as Bishop of Menevia by Pope Benedict XVI, becoming so on 1 December 2008 when he took possession of his new see, on which day he ceased to be Bishop of the Forces. He is now bishop promoter for the Apostleship of the Sea, A Catholic organisation which provides pastoral and practical assistance to all seafarers. It was announced in July 2019 that Burns had retired from the role of Bishop of Menevia after 11 years.

Life and ministry
Tom Burns was born in Belfast, but his family later moved to Lancashire. After studying at St. Mary's College, Blackburn, a sixth form in an Exeter school and a monastery in Paignton, Burns was ordained to the priesthood on 16 December 1971 for the Society of Mary.

On 24 May 2002, he was appointed to head the military ordinariate of Great Britain, the Bishopric of the Forces. He received his episcopal consecration on the following 18 June from Cardinal Cormac Murphy-O'Connor, with Bishop Francis Walmsley and Archbishop Patrick Altham Kelly serving as co-consecrators.

Burns has been a vociferous critic of the UK Ministry of Defence, complaining that troops in Iraq were "frustrated by restrictions, checks and delays that are placed on them but not on their opponents", and that their "activities are often jeopardised by poor equipment, outmoded vehicles and inadequate apparel".

The church closure in Aberystwyth has been criticised.

On 11 July 2019, Pope Francis accepted Burns's resignation after he reached the age of 75. A farewell and thanksgiving Mass was held on 23 July 2019 to mark the beginning of his retirement.

References

External links

1944 births
21st-century Roman Catholic bishops in Wales
Living people
Roman Catholics from Northern Ireland
Clergy from Belfast
Roman Catholic bishops of the Forces
Royal Navy chaplains
Roman Catholic bishops of Menevia
Irish expatriate Catholic bishops